Loftin may refer to:

People

With this surname
Megan Gibson-Loftin (born 1986), American softball coach and player
Brian Loftin (born 1972), American soccer player
Carey Loftin (1914–1997), American stuntman
Colin Loftin (contemporary), American criminologist
Nicholas Loftin (contemporary), American record producer
Nick Loftin (born 1998), American baseball player
Nikki Loftin (born 1972), American fiction author
Peter Loftin (1958–2019), American telecom entrepreneur
R. Bowen Loftin (born 1949), American academic
Robert Loftin (1938–1993), American ornithologist
Scott Loftin (1878–1953), American politician in Florida
Tiffany Dena Loftin (contemporary), American director in the NAACP

With this middle name
Albert Loftin Johnson (1860–1901), American business executive and baseball owner
Tom Loftin Johnson (1854–1911), American politician in Ohio
Tom Loftin Johnson (artist) (1900–1963), American painter and art teacher
Robert Loftin Newman (1827–1912), American painter
Martha Loftin Wilson (1834–1919), American missionary worker and journal editor

Places
Loftin Farm, a farm in North Carolina, United States

See also
Lofton